Alberto Rafael da Silva (born March 24, 1984), or simply Rafael, is a Brazilian goalkeeper.

Club career
In 2008 Alberto signed a contract with Vasco da Gama. After 11 appearances and one year with the club, Alberto went on to sign with Fluminense. Between 2009 and 2011, Alberto became Fluminense's number one goalkeeper making 66 appearances in the time frame. In 2012, he signed a loan contract with Atlético Goianiense.

On 7 July 2014, da Silva left Fluminense and signed a two-year contract with Esteghlal.

Honours 
Itumbiara
 Campeonato Goiano: 2008

Fluminense
 Campeonato Brasileiro Série A: 2010

 Atlético Goianiense
 Campeonato Goiano: 2011

Boavista
 Copa Rio: 2017

America
 Campeonato Carioca Série B1: 2018

External links

References

1984 births
Living people
People from Araraquara
Brazilian footballers
Association football goalkeepers
Expatriate footballers in Iran
Brazilian expatriates in Iran
Campeonato Brasileiro Série A players
Campeonato Brasileiro Série B players
Campeonato Brasileiro Série D players
Esporte Clube São Bento players
Clube Atlético Bragantino players
Associação Atlética Internacional (Limeira) players
Itumbiara Esporte Clube players
CR Vasco da Gama players
Fluminense FC players
Atlético Clube Goianiense players
Botafogo Futebol Clube (SP) players
Ipatinga Futebol Clube players
Grêmio Barueri Futebol players
Esporte Clube Rio Verde players
Bangu Atlético Clube players
Esteghlal F.C. players
Associação Desportiva Cabofriense players
Macaé Esporte Futebol Clube players
Centro Sportivo Alagoano players
Sampaio Corrêa Futebol Clube players
Boavista Sport Club players
America Football Club (RJ) players
Footballers from São Paulo (state)